Krager may refer to:
Dane Krager (born 1979), American footballer
Krager (comics), a DC Comics character